Clipped Wings is a 1953 comedy film starring The Bowery Boys. The film was released on August 14, 1953, by Allied Artists and is the thirty-first film in the series.

Plot
The boys' friend, Dave Moreno, is being held for treason by the U.S. Air Force.  Slip and Sach go to headquarters to help Dave, but mistakenly enlist.  Sach is also mistakenly assigned to a WAF barracks.  When the boys finally do visit Dave he tells them he does not need help, as he is secretly being used to capture enemy agents.  Undeterred by Dave's words, the boys continue to investigate and Slip and Sach wind up airborne.  Good luck allows them to land safely, just where the spies are hiding out.  They capture the spies and Dave's true mission is revealed.

Cast

The Bowery Boys
Leo Gorcey as Terrance Aloysius 'Slip' Mahoney
Huntz Hall as Horace Debussy 'Sach' Jones
David Gorcey as Chuck Anderson (Credited as David Condon)
Bennie Bartlett as Butch Williams

Remaining cast

Production

In a prime example of product placement the "Atomic Jet" amusement coin-operated ride form Nat Cohn's Riteway Sales that appeared in the film and advertising material was offered to be installed in every theatre that showed Clipped Wings

Home media
Released on VHS by Warner Brothers on September 1, 1998.

Warner Archives released the film on made-to-order DVD in the United States as part of "The Bowery Boys, Volume Two" on April 9, 2013.

References

External links

1953 films
American black-and-white films
American spy comedy films
Bowery Boys films
American aviation films
Military humor in film
1950s spy comedy films
Allied Artists films
1953 comedy films
Films about the United States Air Force
1950s English-language films
Films directed by Edward Bernds
1950s American films